Maniyoor is a census town in Kannur district in the Indian state of Kerala.

Demographics
As of 2011 Census, Maniyoor had a population of 12,681 of which 5,902 are males and 6,779 are females. The sex ratio of Maniyoor was 1,149 higher than state average of 1,084. In Maniyoor, population of children under 6 years was 12.6%. Maniyoor had overall literacy of 93.9%, higher than national average of 59% and lower than state average of 94%.

Religion
As of 2011 Indian census, Maniyoor census town had total population of 12,681 which constitute 61.2% Hindus, 38.5% Muslims and 0.3% others.

Transportation
The national highway passes through the town of Valapattanam. Goa and Mumbai can be accessed on the northern side and Cochin and Thiruvananthapuram can be accessed on the southern side. The road to the east of Iritty connects to Mysore and Bangalore.   The nearest railway station is Kannur on the Mangalore-Palakkad line. 

Trains are available to almost all parts of India subject to advance booking over the internet.  There are airports at Mattanur, Mangalore and Calicut. All of them are international airports but direct flights are available only to Middle Eastern countries.

References

Villages near Mayyil
 Cities and towns in Kannur district